The GfK Entertainment charts are record charts compiled by GfK Entertainment on behalf of the German record industry. They include the "Single Top 100" and the "Album Top 100" chart. The chart week runs from Friday to Thursday, and the chart compilations are published on Tuesday for the record industry. The entire top 100 singles and top 100 albums are officially released the following Friday by GfK Entertainment. The charts are based on sales of physical singles and albums from retail outlets as well as permanent music downloads.

Number-one hits by week

References

External links
 charts.de
 germancharts.com

Number-one hits
Germany
2021
2021